Futsal at the Lusofonia Games was first held in the first edition in Macau, in 2006. Only the men's tournament was contested so far.

Men's tournament

Medal table

 

 
F
Futsal
Lusophony Games